Tess Teague (born May 3, 1990) is an American politician who served in the Oklahoma House of Representatives from the 101st district from 2016 to 2018.

On August 28, 2018, she was defeated in the Republican primary for the 101st district.

References

1990 births
Living people
Republican Party members of the Oklahoma House of Representatives